Sam H. Brown was an American farmer and politician from Oregon.

Career
He was a member of the Oregon State Senate, representing Marion County, in the early 20th century. He was the son of Samuel Brown

Brown ran for governor of Oregon in 1934 and 1938. According to the Eugene Register-Guard, he was not a conspicuous leader in the legislature.

Personal life
The Sam Brown House in Gervais, Oregon, was named for his father.

See also

 List of people from Oregon
 Politics of Oregon

References 

Year of birth missing
Place of birth missing
Year of death missing
Place of death missing
20th-century American politicians
Republican Party Oregon state senators
People from Gervais, Oregon